The Wiz is the original motion picture soundtrack album for the 1978 film adaptation of the Broadway musical The Wiz. Although the film was produced for Universal Pictures by Motown Records' film division, the soundtrack album was issued on MCA Records as a two-LP collection (Universal was owned by MCA Inc. at the time). Chiefly produced by Quincy Jones, The Wiz soundtrack features non-sync cast performances by the stars of the film, including Diana Ross, Michael Jackson, Nipsey Russell, Ted Ross, Mabel King, Theresa Merritt, Thelma Carpenter, and Lena Horne. 

Like many musicals of the period, the performances in the soundtrack album are not those used directly in the film, but pre/re-recorded by the same artists at an earlier and/or later date. Several differences are noted, including a missing line by Michael Jackson and a scat section by Nipsey Russell being dropped from the soundtrack version of "A Brand New Day", among others. The song "Is This What Feeling Gets?" was not used in the film's final cut, though the tune is used throughout the film.

The track selection was made up of both songs from the original 1975 Broadway musical by Charlie Smalls and Luther Vandross, as well as new songs written for the film by Jones, Nickolas Ashford & Valerie Simpson, and Anthony Jackson. This soundtrack marks Jones' first collaboration with Michael Jackson; Jones went on to produce Jackson's hit solo albums Off the Wall, Thriller, and Bad.

The soundtrack, with its hit single "Ease on Down the Road", was more successful than the film itself, which was a commercial and critical failure. It was certified Gold in the United States by the RIAA. It also did well in some European territories like the Netherlands, where "A Brand New Day" was a surprise number-one hit. In 2009, Ross ended each of two sold-out performances at the 34,000-seat Geldredome Stadium (in Arnhem, Netherlands) with a finale of "A Brand New Day". The soundtrack also sold well in Australia.

Track listing
All songs written by Charlie Smalls, unless otherwise noted.

Original vinyl listing
All songs written by Charlie Smalls, unless otherwise noted.

Record one, side one
"Main Title (Overture, Part One)" (instrumental)
"Overture (Part Two)" (instrumental)
"The Feeling That We Have" - Theresa Merritt and The Wiz Choir
"Can I Go On?" (Quincy Jones, Nickolas Ashford and Valerie Simpson) - Diana Ross
"Glinda's Theme" (instrumental)
"He's the Wizard" - Thelma Carpenter and The Wiz Choir
"Soon as I Get Home"/"Home" - Diana Ross

Record one, side two
"You Can't Win" - Michael Jackson
"Ease on Down the Road #1" - Diana Ross and Michael Jackson
"What Would I Do If I Could Feel?" - Nipsey Russell
"Slide Some Oil to Me" - Nipsey Russell
"Ease on Down the Road #2" - Diana Ross, Michael Jackson, and Nipsey Russell
"I'm a Mean Ole Lion" - Ted Ross
"Ease on Down the Road #3" - Diana Ross, Michael Jackson, Nipsey Russell, and Ted Ross
"Poppy Girls" - (Anthony Jackson) (instrumental)

Record two, side one
"Be a Lion" - Diana Ross, Michael Jackson, Nipsey Russell, and Ted Ross
"End of the Yellow Brick Road" (instrumental)
"Emerald City Sequence" (music: Jones, lyrics: Smalls) - The Wiz Choir
"So You Wanted to See the Wizard" - Richard Pryor (spoken dialogue)
"Is This What Feeling Gets? (Dorothy's Theme)" (music: Jones, lyrics: Ashford & Simpson) - Diana Ross

Record two, side two
"Don't Nobody Bring Me No Bad News" - Mabel King and Chorus
"A Brand New Day" (Luther Vandross) - Diana Ross, Michael Jackson, Nipsey Russell, Ted Ross, and The Wiz Choir
"Believe in Yourself (Dorothy)" - Diana Ross
"The Good Witch Glinda" (instrumental)
"Believe in Yourself (Reprise)" - Lena Horne
"Home" - Diana Ross

Charts

Certifications

See also
 Diana Ross Sings Songs from The Wiz, a 2015 reissue

References

Musical film soundtracks
Quincy Jones soundtracks
1978 soundtrack albums
Motown soundtracks
MCA Records soundtracks
Michael Jackson albums
Diana Ross soundtracks
Albums produced by Quincy Jones